The Hjorthagen Church is a church building at Dianavägen at Hjorthagen in Stockholm, Sweden. It belongs to the Engelbrekt Parish of the Church of Sweden. Construction began in 1907 and the church was inaugurated on 25 March 1909 by archbishop Johan August Ekman.

References

External links

20th-century Church of Sweden church buildings
Churches in Stockholm
Churches completed in 1909
Churches in the Diocese of Stockholm (Church of Sweden)